The Notre Dame University, also referred to by its acronym NDU, is a private Catholic research basic and higher education institution run by the Missionary Oblates of Mary Immaculate in Cotabato City, Maguindanao, Philippines.It was founded by the Oblates in 1948 and has been a member of the Notre Dame Educational Association, a group of schools in the Philippines named Notre Dame. The Association is under the patronage of the Blessed Virgin Mary.

Notre Dame University has academic programs in graduate school, law, liberal arts,  arts and sciences, engineering, nursing, accountancy, business administration, computer studies and education, as well as secondary, elementary, and preparatory education.

History

The college was founded in 1948, and was the first college in the province. Robert E. Sullivan was its first Rector and Dean. When it opened, there were only 128 students and a pioneering faculty of eight, with classes being held at the Notre Dame of Cotabato Girls Department building the first year. The college obtained its own building the following year.
 
Complete elementary education was offered later with the establishment of the Notre Dame Training Department, envisioned to be a teaching laboratory for Education students majoring in Elementary Education.

With the increase in enrollment, a new school was needed. On February 27, 1959, the cornerstone-laying and blessing of the present University site was held with no less than the Very Rev. Leo Deschatelets, OMI, Superior General of the Oblates, presiding over the ceremony.

The college received its University status on March 11, 1969. In 1980, The Philippine Association of Schools, Colleges and Universities (PAASCU) certified the Level I accreditation of the three colleges of the University, the College of Arts and Sciences, the College of Commerce and the Teachers' College.

In the same year, the Core Curriculum was introduced integrating both Christian and Islamic Values in all core subjects taken by the students.

In 1983, a program towards a doctoral degree in the field of Education, major in Peace and Development Education was introduced.

In school year 1997-98, the University, in cooperation with the Mindanao Advanced Education Project (MAEP) of the Commission on Higher Education, offered a Doctor of Philosophy (Ph.D.) in Peace and Development Education and Master of Arts (M.A.) in Peace and Development Education.

In 2001, NDU was afforded a deregulated status by the Commission on Higher Education. Hence, NDU enjoys the following benefits: Issuance of Special Order, Deregulated Monitoring/ Evaluation of CHED, Access to Subsidies/ Assistance, Curricular Prescriptions, and Conferring Honoris Causa.

Accreditation

Autonomous Status

On January 4, 2021 Commission on Higher Education (CHED) awarded the Autonomous Status to Notre Dame University.

PAASCU Accreditation
Notre Dame University has obtained accreditation from the Philippine Accrediting Association of Schools, Colleges and Universities (PAASCU)

Level III Re-accredited:

College of Education
Bachelor of Elementary Education
Bachelor of Physical Education
Bachelor of Secondary Education major in English
Bachelor of Secondary Education major in Filipino
Bachelor of Secondary Education major in Mathematics
Bachelor of Secondary Education major in Science

Level II Re-accredited:

College of Business and Accountancy
Bachelor of Science in Accountancy

Certified as MikroTik Academy

Notre Dame University has become a MikroTik Academy in the Philippines. This opportunity means the College of Computer Studies can offer MikroTik Certified Associate (MTCNA) Course to the Students.

Colleges
Graduate School
College of Law
College of Arts and Sciences
College of Business and Accountancy
College of Education
College of Engineering and Computer Studies
College of Health and Sciences

Facility

Other schools in Philippines named Notre Dame 
 Notre Dame of Dadiangas University
 Notre Dame of Marbel University
 Notre Dame of Kidapawan College
 Notre Dame of Midsayap College
 Notre Dame of Tacurong College
 Notre Dame of Greater Manila
 Notre Dame – RVM College of Cotabato
 Notre Dame of Salaman College
 Notre Dame of Jolo College
 Notre Dame of Cagayan - Mapun, Tawi-Tawi

References

External links
 

Catholic universities and colleges in the Philippines
Oblate schools in the Philippines
Notre Dame Educational Association
Educational institutions established in 1948
Universities and colleges in Cotabato City
Universities established in the 1960s